Capital Football  is one of seven federations of New Zealand Football, representing the wider Wellington Region, including Hutt Valley, Wairarapa and Horowhenua-Kapiti.

History 

Capital Football was first formed as Wellington Football Association (WFA) on 12 March 1890. Before the association was formed, teams had already been formed in Wellington, with the Wellington Rovers being the first formed on the 3 April 1889. The first game played under the English Football Association rules was played between two teams of Wellington Rovers players on the 6 April 1889. The first game between two clubs was played later that year on 8 June between the Rovers and the newly formed Petone Wanderers. The game was played at Wellington College with the Wanderers winning 2–0.

Some of the first clubs that were part of the Wellington Football Association are still in existence today including Waterside (1921), Swifts (1894) and Karori (1912) who are now Waterside Karori. United (1892) and Diamond (1893) who are now Wellington United. Porirua United (1904) and Hospital (1907) who are now Western Suburbs. Then you have Wellington Marist (1902) and Miramar Rangers (1908) still playing under their original names.

In 1984 the association changed their name to Wellington Soccer Association (WSA). During May 1999 New Zealand Soccer set up the seven Federations when previously there was 23 District Associations, WSA looked after Federation Five and then incorporated and renamed as Capital Soccer on 29 November 2000. When New Zealand Soccer changed their name to New Zealand Football, the federations followed suit and Capital Soccer became Capital Football in 2007.

While New Zealand Football is the governing body, unlike other sports in New Zealand, the funding model for football means each seven regional federations look after football in their area themselves, only following New Zealand Football's plan as they see fit. For the local federations, the clubs fund the federation with the rest of the money coming from Sport New Zealand funding and about three per cent from New Zealand Football.

Board Members 
As of 2018.
Paul Houliston (Board Chair)
Dave Trueman (Deputy Chair)
Mike Moore
Helen Mallon
Jess Fraser
Chris James
Mike Hornsby
Craig Deadman

Competitions
 Central League
 Capital Premier
 Capital Football W-League

Note: Central League can include teams from the Central Federation and is a lower North Island competition managed by Capital Football.

Affiliated clubs
As of 2017.

See also 

 Association football in New Zealand
 Auckland Football Federation
 Northern Football Federation
 Central Football

References

External links 

 Capital Football - official site

Association football in New Zealand
Sport in Wellington
1890 establishments in New Zealand